Guareí is a municipality in the state of São Paulo in Brazil. The population is 18,887 (2020 est.) in an area of 566 km². The elevation is 635 m.

References

Municipalities in São Paulo (state)